Jalala  is a village and union council in Mardan District of Khyber Pakhtunkhwa, Pakistan.

Jalala is situated about 20 km north from Mardan. The Malakand road leads through the village linking the Swat Valley to Mardan and Peshawar. At the time of the British Empire, there was a long bazaar,  Hindus, Muslims and Sikhs shopkeepers were living side by side. There was a large Hindu community living peacefully in Jalala.

Before 1947, there were two chiefs of Jalala named Sharif Malik (of The Khwaidad Khel Clan) and Akhi Malik (of Utmanzai clan). There goes a famous saying about the honesty and rightfulness of Sharif Malik: "da Sharif Malik khabara, da kaanrhi karkha"

(د شریف ملک خبرہ د کانڑی کرخہ)

which means Sharif Malik stands by his words no matter what. He was one of the very few landlords who had the landlord vote during the British rule. Khwaidad Khel and Utmanzi were and are still the dominant families of Jalala. Both are the subtribes of Yousafzai tribe. These families along with the other 90 families migrated to Jalala from Ghwarha Marghay, Qandahar Afghanistan as early as1611 AD. Jalala village was under the control of the Takht Bahi Police Station.

Jalala once faced a shortage of drinking water. The women of the town brought the water in clay pots from the nearby river. One particular section of the river was very busy and was popularly called “Da Jalala Gudar” which means a place by river side from where drinking water can be taken to home etc. in the Pashto language. The times for bringing water were early morning and before sunset.

For this reason Jalala gained popularity in Pashto poetry. The famous song about Jalala Gudar was played frequently from Peshawar Radio Station.”Da Jalala Oba Khwagey Dee” ...Da kalee peghley” Tre Mangee Radakaveena, Da Jalala. Another song “Da Jalala Gudara wran shey … Pa jeenakoo De salandaay olagawana”. There is also a Pashto saying (Matal): ”Kor de da jalala jumat sha”. There was a time when most of the people of Jalala left for their agriculture land look after to Khan Qilla (خان قلعہ), Takkar and Maday Baba, then there was nobody to look after a small mosque. After a short time the mosque collapsed completely because of monsoon rains.
Jalala has three small rivers. Two of these have warm water and the third one has cold water .

Jalala is surrounded by many small villages, including Parkho, Safiabad, Maskeenabad, Bare Shah, Ghano Shah, Khan Qilla (خان قلعہ), Pirsaddo, Maday Baba, Chiraghdeen Kalay, Parao and Kanda Ghaar.

The main tribes of Jalala are Khwaidad Khel & Utmanzai, and other tribes include Batoor Khel, Hasan khel, Kalalaan, Shalmani, Karan Khel, Gujran, Gadbane, kulalan, Bajawri, Syedan, Mohmandan, Barangian, Deerojee, and some refugees from Afghanistan.

References

Union councils of Mardan District
Populated places in Mardan District